Lester Francel (14 April 1950 – 14 March 2021) was a Colombian weightlifter. He competed in the men's flyweight event at the 1972 Summer Olympics.

References

External links

1950 births
2021 deaths
Colombian male weightlifters
Olympic weightlifters of Colombia
Weightlifters at the 1972 Summer Olympics
Pan American Games medalists in weightlifting
Pan American Games silver medalists for Colombia
Pan American Games bronze medalists for Colombia
Weightlifters at the 1971 Pan American Games
20th-century Colombian people
21st-century Colombian people